Micrurus frontalis, also known as the southern coral snake or short-tailed coral snake, is a species of a highly venomous coral snake in the family Elapidae. It is found in South America.

Description 
This species grows on average to 75 cm in length, with a maximum of 164 cm already reported.  The color of the head varies, with a gray pigment on the top of the snout. The body pattern consists of very wide red bands that are separated by a series of 10–15 narrower black triads with 3 blacks separated by narrow white bands. The dorsal scales are red, with black tips of dark appearance. The tail has two complete triads.

It is a nocturnal, terrestrial and fossorial snake, which digs loose soil or litter, has been one of the main accident-causing corals in Southeast South America, although it is not relatively aggressive towards humans, it has Oviparous reproduction, although eggs / clutch has not been reported.

Distribution and Habitat 
Micrurus frontalis is found in south-central Brazil, Paraguay, and northern Argentina. It mainly lives in humid forests, tropical and subtropical deciduous forests, savannas, sandy and rocky areas, in secondary vegetation such as pastures and agricultural land, close to marshes and streams, it inhabits lowlands, from sea level to an elevation of 700 m.

Diet 
It feeds on lizards and other snakes (including blind snakes). Cannibalism has been reported in this species.

Venom 
Like all elapids in Brazil, Micrurus frontalis has post-synaptic neurotoxins (except for Micrurus corallinus) that bind to terminal motor acetylcholine receptors, the toxin is composed of low molecular weight polypeptides, which are rapidly absorbed by the body after inoculation and symptoms can appear in minutes, the toxin acts peripherally, blocking neuromuscular transmission. Muscle paralysis is a consequence of the action of the toxin with the neurotransmitter by the nicotinic receptor on the end plate.

At the site of the bite, edema and paresthesias occur, the initial systemic symptoms of most coral accidents, include eyelid ptosis and diplopia, which are followed by facial muscle paralysis, visual impairment, anisocoria, dysarthria, dysphagia, salivation and generalized loss of muscle strength, in severe cases, life-threatening respiratory arrest occurs, with patients requiring artificial ventilation. The median lethal dose is 22 μg for mice weighing 4–29 grams, and 0.69 mg/kg. The estimates of average yield range between 10 and 30 mg (dry weight), depending on the source.

References 

frontalis
Snakes of South America
Reptiles of Argentina
Reptiles of Brazil
Reptiles of Paraguay
Reptiles described in 1854
Taxa named by André Marie Constant Duméril
Taxa named by Gabriel Bibron
Taxa named by Auguste Duméril